Wilfred "Wilf" George (24 January 1960) is a former professional rugby league footballer who played in the 1980s and 1990s.

Playing career

Championship appearances
Wilf George played in the Halifax team that won the Championship during the 1985–86 season. He was signed from Widnes in February 1986 for a fee of £13,000 (based on increases in average earnings, this would be approximately £49,870 in 2014), and played 10-games for Halifax in the remainder of the season scoring 2-tries, the second being in the last League game of the season against Featherstone Rovers on Sunday 20 April 1986, when a 13-13 draw at Thrum Hall clinched the Championship.

Challenge Cup Final appearances
Wilf George played  and scored the first try of the match in Halifax's 19-18 victory over St. Helens in the 1987 Challenge Cup Final during the 1986–87 season at Wembley Stadium, London on Saturday 2 May 1987.

Regal Trophy Final appearances
Wilf George played  in Halifax's 12-24 defeat by Wigan in the 1989–90 Regal Trophy Final during the 1989–90 season at Headingley, Leeds on Saturday 13 January 1990.

Rugby League Referee
Wilf George is a British Amateur Rugby League Association referee.

Genealogical Information
Wilf George is the father of the rugby league footballers; Marcus George, and Luke George.

References

External links
Dragons Create History
Halifax ARL Presentation Evening
Statistics at rugby.widnes.tv

1960 births
Living people
Batley Bulldogs players
English rugby league players
Halifax R.L.F.C. players
Huddersfield Giants players
Place of birth missing (living people)
Rugby league wingers
Widnes Vikings players